There are several stadiums in Romania with the name Stadionul CFR:

 Stadionul CFR (Craiova)
 Stadionul CFR (Paşcani)
 Stadionul CFR (Timișoara)